Riprap (in North American English), also known as rip rap, rip-rap, shot rock, rock armour (in British English) or rubble, is human-placed rock or other material used to protect shoreline structures against scour and water, wave, or ice erosion. Ripraps are used to armor shorelines, streambeds, bridge abutments, foundational infrastructure supports and other shoreline structures against erosion. Common rock types used include granite and modular concrete blocks. Rubble from building and paving demolition is sometimes used, as well as specifically designed structures called tetrapods.

Riprap is also used underwater to cap immersed tubes sunken on the seabed to be joined into an undersea tunnel.

Environmental effects

Sediment effects 
Ripraps cause morphological changes in the riverbeds they surround. One such change is the reduction of sediment settlement in the river channel, which can lead to scouring of the river bed as well as coarser sediment particles. This can be combatted by increasing the distance between the pieces of riprap and using a variety of sizes. 

The usage of ripraps may not even stop erosion, but simply move it downstream. Additionally, the soil beneath the riprap can be eroded if the rock was just placed on top without any buffer between the layers such as a geotextile fabric or smaller riprap (crushed stone).

Changes in organic material and the ecosystem 
Riprap affects the amount of organic material in a waterbody by acting as a filter, catching wood and leaves before they can enter the water. Riprap also covers and prevents plants from growing through, which can reduce shade over the water.

Introducing ripraps creates a rocky environment which can affect the ecology of a waterbody by making the ecosystem more heterogeneous. While it can negatively affect some organisms by removing shoreline vegetation, the rock can provide important refuge for invertebrates and small fish. By preventing woody plants from growing and shading the water, riprap can also increase the amount of algae and hydrophytes.

Gallery

See also
 Debris
 Rubble

References

 Ciria-CUR (2007) - Rock Manual - The use of rock in hydraulic engineering.
 N.W.H. Allsop (2002) - Breakwaters, coastal structures and coastlines.
US Dept. of Transportation (2004) -  Trail Construction and Maintenance Notebook

External links
Ohio Dept. of Natural Resources riprap guide
US Bureau of Reclamation publication on riprap for dam overtopping
Minnesota DNR
USGS Minerals Yearbook: Stone, Crushed

Building stone
Types of wall
Earthworks (engineering)
Coastal construction